Will You Be There? is a 2016 South Korean fantasy drama film directed by Hong Ji-young, based on the French novel, Seras-tu là?, by Guillaume Musso. The film stars Kim Yoon-seok, Byun Yo-han and Chae Seo-jin.

Cast

Main
 Kim Yoon-seok as Soo-hyeon 
 Byun Yo-han as Soo-hyeon (young) 
 Chae Seo-jin as Yeon-ah (young)

Supporting
 Kim Sang-ho as Tae-ho
 Ahn Se-ha as Tae-ho (young) 
 Park Hye-su as Soo-ah
 Kim Ho-jung as Hye-won
 Yoon Jin-yeong as dolphin show business head
 Lee Yoo-mi as animal society employee
 Lee Ho-cheol as cigarette store clerk

Cameo appearances
 Kim Ji-young as veterinarian
 Jang Gwang as Soo-hyeon's father
 Kim Sun-a as Sun-yeong
 Kim Kwang-kyu as postman 
 Park Kil-soo as barbershop owner  
 Park Hee-von as Hye-won (young)

Special appearances
 Kim Sung-ryung as Yeon-ah
 Jung In-gi as Yoon
 Kim Hyo-jin as Irina
 Shim Eun-jin as woman at conference

Awards and nominations

References

External links

Will You Be There? at Naver Movies 

2016 films
South Korean fantasy drama films
South Korean romantic drama films
2016 romantic drama films
2010s fantasy drama films
Films about time travel
Films based on French novels
Lotte Entertainment films
2010s South Korean films